Alypius or Olympius ( or Ὀλύμπιος; died 169) was the bishop of Byzantium during the second half of the 2nd century AD. The date when he became the bishop of Byzantium is not known for certain, but is most likely somewhere between 166 and 167. Additionally, the length of his term is not known, but it is believed to be three years (166–169).

He succeeded Bishop Laurence and his successor was Pertinax.

Sources
 www.ec-patr.org

2nd-century Romans
2nd-century Byzantine bishops
Bishops of Byzantium
169 deaths
Year of birth unknown